Dudde Doddappa is a 1966 Indian Kannada-language film, directed and produced by B. R. Panthulu. The film stars B. R. Panthulu, M. V. Rajamma, Ramesh and Narasimharaju. It was remade in Tamil as Namma Veettu Lakshmi (1966) and in Telugu as Lakshmi Nivasam (1968).

Cast 

B. R. Panthulu
M. V. Rajamma
Narasimharaju
Bharathi Vishnuvardhan
Giriyan
Gururaj
Ganapathi Bhat
Hanumanthachar
Krishna Shastry
Nagappa
Bhavanishankar
Dasharatha
Honnappa
Shivaramaiah
L. N. Swamy
Shivaram
Gurusiddappa
Sharada
Papamma
Shanthamma
Padmavathamma
Vijayakumari
Suguna
Suryakumari
Vijayabharathi
Kumari Yashoda
Krishnakumar
V. R. Lakshmi

Soundtrack 
The music was composed by T. G. Lingappa.

References

External links 
 

1966 films
Indian drama films
1960s Kannada-language films
Films scored by T. G. Lingappa
Films directed by B. R. Panthulu
Kannada films remade in other languages
1966 drama films